Colonel Newcome is a 1906 play by the British writer Michael Morton. It is based on the character from the 1855 William Makepeace Thackeray novel The Newcomes. The part was written for the actor Herbert Beerbohm Tree.

References

Bibliography
 Matthews, Brander. Playwrights on playmaking, and other studies of the stage. 1923.

Plays by Michael Morton
1906 plays
Plays based on novels